Przemysław Adam Frankowski (born 12 April 1995) is a Polish professional footballer who plays as a winger for Ligue 1 club Lens and the Poland national team.

Club career

Jagiellonia Białystok
On 1 August 2014, Frankowski signed a three-year contract with Jagiellonia Białystok.

Frankowski made his Europa League debut on 9 July 2015 in an 8–0 win against Kruoja Pakruojis being substituted in the 62 min. for Piotr Grzelczak. He scored a hat-trick scoring goals in the 64th, 75th and 80th minutes. He also made appearances against Omonia Nicosia.

Chicago Fire
On 22 January 2019, Frankowski moved to Major League Soccer side Chicago Fire. he debuted for Chicago Fire in a 2–1 loss against LA Galaxy on 3 March 2019. The following week, on 9 March 2019, he got his first assist for the club after crossing the ball into the box, which led to C. J. Sapong scoring a goal and tying up the game in stoppage time. Frankowski's first goal for the Fire came on 8 May 2019 when he scored the fifth goal of the night in the 89th minute in a 5–0 win against New England Revolution.

Lens
On 5 August 2021, Frankowski signed for Ligue 1 club Lens for a reported €2.3 million.

International career
Frankowski made his debut for the Poland national team in a friendly against Nigeria in a 1–0 loss. He was subbed out in the 81st minute. In May 2018, he was named in Poland's preliminary 35-man squad for the 2018 World Cup in Russia. However, he did not make the final 23.

Career statistics

Club

International

Scores and results list Poland's goal tally first, score column indicates score after each Frankowski goal.

Honours
Jagiellonia Białystok
 Ekstraklasa: runner-up 2016–17, 2017–18

References

External links
 
 
 

1995 births
Living people
Polish footballers
Association football midfielders
Poland youth international footballers
Poland under-21 international footballers
Poland international footballers
UEFA Euro 2020 players
2022 FIFA World Cup players
Ekstraklasa players
Major League Soccer players
Ligue 1 players
Lechia Gdańsk players
Jagiellonia Białystok players
Chicago Fire FC players
RC Lens players
Sportspeople from Gdańsk
Polish expatriate footballers
Polish expatriate sportspeople in the United States
Polish expatriate sportspeople in France
Expatriate soccer players in the United States
Expatriate footballers in France